Altti Matti Ensio Alarotu (30 September 1945 – 8 April 2005) was a Finnish athlete. He competed in the men's pole vault at the 1968 Summer Olympics.

References

External links
 

1945 births
2005 deaths
Athletes (track and field) at the 1968 Summer Olympics
Finnish male pole vaulters
Olympic athletes of Finland
People from Jämijärvi
Sportspeople from Satakunta